The 2020 season is Urawa Red Diamonds's 20th consecutive season in J1 League, after finishing 14th in the 2019 J1 League. The club also will compete in the J.League Cup.

Squad
As of 18 February 2020.

Competitions

J1 League

League table

Results summary

Results by matchday

Matches

Emperor's Cup

J.League Cup

Group stage

Statistics

Goal scorers

Clean sheets

References 

Urawa Red Diamonds
Urawa Red Diamonds seasons